Elbridge Township may refer to the following places in the United States:

 Elbridge Township, Edgar County, Illinois
 Elbridge Township, Michigan

Township name disambiguation pages